Milomir is a Slavic masculine given name, a Slavic name derived from milo "love, to like" and mir "world, peace, prestige" or  Indo-European mære "famous, shining, prominent". It may refer to:
 Milomir Bogdanov, Bulgarian architect and public person
 Milomir Kovac, Serbian-German veterinary surgeon
 Milomir Marić, Serbian journalist
 Milomir Miljanić, Montenegrin musician
 Milomir Minić, Serbian politician
 Milomir Odović, Bosnian football manager and former player 
 Milomír Pacholík. 1957 1958 director of a grammar school in Prague
 Milomír Pergl, czech pilot in RAF
 Milomir Sivčević, Bosnian footballer
 Milomir Stakić, Bosnian Serb war-time politician
 Milomir Šešlija, Bosnian football manager and former player

In Slovakia on 3th July each year celebrated the name day  of Milomír.

See also
 Miomir
 Mjölnir
 Theodemir
 ·Valamir
 Vidimir
 ·Marchomir

Slavic masculine given names
Bulgarian masculine given names
Serbian masculine given names
Czech masculine given names
Bosnian masculine given names
Croatian masculine given names
Montenegrin masculine given names
Slovak masculine given names
Slovene masculine given names